Gascoigne is a 2015 documentary about the English footballer Paul Gascoigne.

References

External links
 

British association football films
Documentary films about association football